Hello Fear is the tenth album overall by Kirk Franklin. The live portion of the album was recorded on December 17, 2010, according to information on social media. It is his first to be released through Verity Gospel Music Group The first single "I Smile" reached number 85 on the Billboard Hot 100, making it his first single in six years to appear on that chart; last single to do so was "Looking for You" in 2005 which reached number 61. The album debuted at number five on the Billboard 200 with 87,000 copies sold in the first week, becoming his first album in nine years to debut in the top ten; last album being The Rebirth of Kirk Franklin in 2002 which debuted at number four. The album has sold over 401,000 copies, ranking as the 64th highest selling album in the US in 2011. On February 12, 2012, the album was certified Gold by the RIAA. In 2012, the album won Grammy Award for Best Gospel Album. As of August 2015, the album has sold 572,000 copies in the US.

Track listing

Personnel

Main vocalists/ensemble
Nikki Ross, 1st Soprano
Anaysha Figueroa, 2nd Soprano
Cheryl Fortune, 1st Alto
Charmaine Swimpson, 2nd Alto
Eric Moore, 1st Tenor
Isaac Carree, 2nd Tenor

Additional vocalists
Candy West (soprano)
Faith Anderson (soprano)
Peaches West (alto)
Debette Draper (alto)
Michael Bethany (tenor)
Deonis Cook (tenor)
Myron Butler (tenor)

Musicians
Kirk Franklin - Keyboards
Shaun Martin - Keyboards, Programming
Bobby Sparks - Hammond B-3, Programming
Terry Baker - Drums, Percussion
Todd Parsnow - Lead Guitar
Keith Taylor - Bass Guitar
Ernest "Ernie G" Green - DJ
Darius Fentress - Percussion
Matt Butler - Cello
Robert "Sput" Searight - Snare
Doc Powell - Lead Guitar
Nat Powers - Drums, Programming, Keys
Philip Lassiter - Trumpet, Flugelhorn
Jeff Coffin - Baritone Saxophone, Flute Trio
Nick Marchione - Lead Trumpet
Doug DeHays - Baritone Saxophone
Brian Clancey - Flute
Teddy Riley - Vocoder, Voice-Box

Engineering
Rob Chiarelli: Mix Engineer

Charts

Weekly charts

Year-end charts

Certifications

References

2011 albums
Kirk Franklin albums
Grammy Award for Best Gospel Album